Eriogonum alpinum is a species of wild buckwheat known by the common name Trinity buckwheat.

Description
The woolly greenish leaves are rounded and one to three centimeters long.

The plant produces an erect inflorescence of bright yellow to pinkish flowers, each under a centimeter wide.

The fruit is an achene about half a centimeter long.

Distribution and habitat 
This rare plant is endemic to northern California. It is known from only about ten occurrences in the Mount Eddy and Cory Peak areas of the Trinity Mountains, within the Shasta-Trinity National Forest in southern Siskiyou County and northwestern Trinity County.

The Trinity Mountains are a range of the Klamath Mountains System.

Conservation
This species is a California Department of Fish and Wildlife listed and a California Native Plant Society listed endangered species.

See also

References

External links
 Calflora Database: Eriogonum alpinum (Trinity buckwheat)
Jepson Manual eFlora (TJM2) treatment of Eriogonum alpinum
UC CalPhotos gallery of Eriogonum alpinum (Trinity buckwheat) images

alpinum
Endemic flora of California
Flora of the Klamath Mountains
Natural history of Siskiyou County, California
Natural history of Trinity County, California
~
~
Taxa named by George Engelmann